Andrei Yurevich Gavrilin (born July 24, 1978) is a Kazakhstani former professional ice hockey winger who last played for Barys Astana of the Kontinental Hockey League (KHL).

Career
Gavrilin began his career with Avangard Omsk in 1997, but played just 3 games with the club before being demoted to the Vysshaya Liga the next season. He then played five years with HC Lipetsk before returning to Kazakhstan with Kazakhmys Karagandy in 2004. In 2007-08, he joined Barys Astana, and had a career year, scoring 21 goals and 48 points in the Vysshaya Liga, helping the club earn a promotion to the Kontinental Hockey League the following season.

International
Gavrilin participated at the 2010 IIHF World Championship as a member of the Kazakhstan men's national ice hockey team, recording 1 assist in 6 games. He also competed for Kazakhstan at the 2014 IIHF World Championship.

Career statistics

References

External links

1978 births
Living people
Avangard Omsk players
Barys Nur-Sultan players
HC Lipetsk players
Kazakhmys Satpaev players
Kazakhstani ice hockey right wingers
Kazakhstani people of Russian descent
People from Temirtau
Traktor Chelyabinsk players
Asian Games gold medalists for Kazakhstan
Medalists at the 2011 Asian Winter Games
Asian Games medalists in ice hockey
Ice hockey players at the 2011 Asian Winter Games